Stringtown is an unincorporated community located in Bolivar County, Mississippi, United States.

A post office operated under the name Stringtown from 1906 to 1965 and under the name Stringtown Rural Station from 1965 to 1974.

Notable people
L.V. Banks, Chicago blues guitarist and singer 
Eddie Shaw, Chicago blues tenor saxophonist

References

Unincorporated communities in Bolivar County, Mississippi
Unincorporated communities in Mississippi